Clavaporania fitchorum is a species of starfish in the family Poraniidae. It is the only known species of the genus Clavaporania. It is native to the South Pacific Ocean and is found in deep water off the coast of Australia (it was discovered at Hjort Seamount, south of Macquarie Island).

Description
Clavaporania fitchorum has a classical starfish shape with five short arms and a somewhat inflated body. The aboral surface is covered with club-shaped spinelets.

Distribution
Clavaporania fitchorum has been found during a deep-sea survey by the US Antarctic Research Program at Hjort Seamount, off the coast of Macquarie Island, at 1600 meters deep. Even if this was the only recorded observation to date, this species may have a large distribution, as it is often the case with deep-sea species.

Bibliography
 .

References

External links
 

Poraniidae
Animals described in 2014
Monotypic echinoderm genera